The women's hammer throw at the 2017 World Championships in Athletics was held at the Olympic Stadium on 5 and 7 August.

Summary
As the only woman to have thrown over 80 metres, world record holder Anita Włodarczyk was the clear favourite. While she was the first to throw over 70 metres in this competition, the next thrower, the home team's Sophie Hitchon threw better. By the end of the round, four more women threw better, the early leader was Włodarczyk's Polish teammate Malwina Kopron with a throw of 74.46 metres. In the second round, Wang Zheng jumped from second to first with a throw of 75.94 metres. The third Pole in the competition Joanna Fiodorow moved into third place with a throw of 73.02 metres. In the third round, Fiodorow was displaced by Zhang Wenxiu, then three throwers later by Hanna Skydan with a throw of 73.38 metres. During that round, Włodarczyk had improved to 71.94 metres, but was in sixth place only 60 centimetres ahead of the last qualifying spot for the final three attempts. In the fourth round, Włodarczyk finally broke through getting off a throw of 77.39 metres to take the lead. Nobody would be able to improve upon that, but Włodarczyk wasn't done, throwing 77.90 metres in the fifth round. Wang threw her best of 75.98 metres on her final attempt but it couldn't catch Włodarczyk. Nobody else could beat Kopron's first round throw to get a medal.

Records
Before the competition records were as follows:

No records were set at the competition.

Qualification standard
The standard to qualify automatically for entry was 71.00 metres.

Schedule
The event schedule, in local time (UTC+1), was as follows:

Results

Qualification
The qualification round took place on 5 August, in two groups, with Group A starting at 10:34 and Group B starting at 12:06. Athletes attaining a mark of at least 71.50 metres ( Q ) or at least the 12 best performers ( q ) qualified for the final. The overall results were as follows:

Final
The final took place on 7 August at 18:59. The results were as follows:

References

Hammer throw
Hammer throw at the World Athletics Championships
2017 in women's athletics